Prasophyllum macrostachyum, commonly known as the laughing leek orchid, is a species of orchid endemic to the south-west of Western Australia. It has a single smooth, tube-shaped leaf and up to thirty yellowish-green and purple flowers. It is one of the few Western Australian leek orchids which is not stimulated by summer fires and also has an unusually long flowering period.

Description
As with others in the genus, the flowers are inverted so that the labellum is above the column rather than below it. Flowering occurs from September to January.

Taxonomy and naming
Prasophyllum macrostachyum was first formally described in 1810 by Robert Brown and the description was published in Prodromus Florae Novae Hollandiae et Insulae Van Diemen. The specific epithet (macrostachyum) is derived from the Ancient Greek words makros meaning "long" and stachys meaning "an ear of grain" or "a spike", referring to the long flowering stem.

Distribution and habitat
The laughing leek orchid grows with shrubs and sedges in areas that are wet in winter and occurs between Dongara and Cape Le Grand National Park.

Conservation
This orchid is classified as "not threatened" by the Western Australian Government Department of Parks and Wildlife.

References

External links 
 

macrostachyum
Endemic flora of Western Australia
Endemic orchids of Australia
Plants described in 1810